Şirvanlı (also, Shirvanly) is a village and municipality in the Barda Rayon of Azerbaijan.  It has a population of 2,019.

References

Populated places in Barda District